Nanotomography, much like its related modalities tomography and microtomography, uses x-rays to create cross-sections from a 3D-object that later can be used to recreate a virtual model without destroying the original model, applying Nondestructive testing. The term nano is used to indicate that the pixel sizes of the cross-sections are in the nanometer range

Nano-CT beamlines have been built at 3rd generation synchrotron radiation facilities, including the Advanced Photon Source of Argonne National Laboratory, SPring-8, and ESRF  from early 2000s. They have been applied to wide variety of three-dimensional visualization studies, such as those of comet samples returned by the Startdust mission, mechanical degradation in lithium-ion batteries, and neuron deformation in schizophrenic brains. 

Although a lot of research is done to create nano-CT scanners, currently there are only a few available commercially. The SkyScan-2011  has a range of about 150 to 250 nanometers per pixel with a resolution of 400 nm and a field of view (FOV) of 200 micrometers.  The Xradia nanoXCT  has a spatial resolution of better than 50 nm and a FOV of 16 micrometers.

At the Ghent University, the UGCT team developed a nano-CT scanner based on commercially available components. The UGCT facility is an open nano-CT facility giving access to scientists from universities, institutes and industry. More information can be found at UGCT-website.

Footnotes

References 
De Andrade, V, Deriy, A, Wojcik, MJ, Gürsoy, D, Shu, D, Fezzaa, K, and De Carlo, F. (2016) "Nanoscale 3D imaging at the Advanced Photon Source", SPIE Newsroom DOI:10.1117/2.1201604.006461.
Takeuchi, A, Uesugi, K, Takano, H, and Suzuki, Y (2002) "Submicrometer-resolution three-dimensional imaging with hard x-ray imaging microtomography", Rev. Sci. Instrum. 73, 4246 DOI:10.1063/1.1515385.
Schroer, C G, Meyer, J, Kuhlmann, M, Benner, B, Günzler, T F, Lengeler, B, Rau, C, Weitkamp, T, Snigirev, A and Snigireva, I. (2002) "Nanotomography based on hard x-ray microscopy with refractive lenses", Appl. Phys. Lett. 81, 1527, DOI:10.1063/1.1501451.
Flynn, G J et al. (2006) "Elemental compositions of Comet 81P/Wild 2 samples collected by Stardust", Science 314, 1731-1735 DOI:10.1126/science.1136141. 
Müller, S, Pietsch, P, Brandt, B, Baade, P, De Andrade, V, De Carlo, F, and Wood, V. (2018) "Quantification and modeling of mechanical degradation in lithium-ion batteries based on nanoscale imaging", Nat. Commun. 9, 2340 DOI:10.1038/s41467-018-04477-1.
Mizutani, R et al. (2019) "Three-dimensional alteration of neurites in schizophrenia", Transl. Psychiatry 9, 85 DOI:10.1038/s41398-019-0427-4.
Tkachuk, A, Duewer, F, Cui, H, Feser, M, Wang, S and Yun, W (2007) "X-ray computed tomography in Zernike phase contrast mode at 8 keV with 50-nm resolution using Cu rotation anode X-ray source", Z. Kristallogr. 222.
Medical imaging
Microscopes